Hurlevent ("Howling wind") is a 1985 French drama film directed by Jacques Rivette. It is an adaptation of Emily Brontë's 1847 novel Wuthering Heights. Based on the first part of the novel and set in 1930s southern France, it starred three unknown actors: Fabienne Babe as Catherine, Lucas Belvaux as Roch (Heathcliff), and Olivier Cruveiller as Catherine's brother.

Plot summary

Cast
 Fabienne Babe  as Catherine
 Lucas Belvaux as Roch
 Sandra Montaigu as Hélène
 Alice de Poncheville as Isabelle
 Olivier Cruveiller as Guillaume
 Philippe Morier-Genoud as Joseph
 Olivier Torres as Olivier
 Marie Jaoul as Madame Lindon
 Louis de Menthon as Monsieur Lindon
 Jacques Deleuze as Le médecin
 Joseph Schilinger as Le garde-chasse

References

External links
 
 

1985 films
French avant-garde and experimental films
Films directed by Jacques Rivette
Films based on Wuthering Heights
1980s avant-garde and experimental films
1980s French-language films
1980s French films